Manuel Vicente Torres Morales (born 25 November 1978 in Panama City, Panama) is a football midfielder who currently plays in Panama for Liga Panameña de Fútbol team CAI.

Club career
He started his career at hometown club Árabe Unido and also played for San Francisco. Nicknamed el Cholo, he joined Plaza Amador in 2012 after 8 years with San Francisco.

International career
Torres made his debut for Panama in a January 2000 friendly match against Guatemala, in which he immediately scored a goal, and has earned a total of 35 caps, scoring 1 goal. He represented his country in 6 FIFA World Cup qualification matches and played at the 2007 and 2009 CONCACAF Gold Cups.

His final international was a July 2009 CONCACAF Gold Cup match against the United States.

International goals
Scores and results list Panama's goal tally first.

Honors
Club
ANAPROF (3): 2006, 2007 (A), 2008 (A)

Individual
Chosen best midfielder of ANAPROF in 2006

References

External links
 
 Profile - Plaza Amador

1978 births
Living people
Sportspeople from Panama City
Association football midfielders
Panamanian footballers
C.D. Árabe Unido players
San Francisco F.C. players
C.D. Plaza Amador players
Panama international footballers
2007 CONCACAF Gold Cup players
2009 UNCAF Nations Cup players
2009 CONCACAF Gold Cup players
Copa Centroamericana-winning players
C.A. Independiente de La Chorrera players